Jan-Philip Glania (born 8 November 1988) is a German swimmer who specialises in the backstroke.

At the 2012 Summer Olympics he finished 12th overall in the heats in the Men's 100 metre backstroke and 6th in the semi final, but failed to reach the final. He also reached the semi-finals in the 200 m backstroke.

At the 2016 Summer Olympics in Rio de Janeiro, he competed in the 100 m backstroke. He finished 12th in the semifinals and did not qualify for the final. He also competed in the 200 m backstroke where he finished 9th in the semifinals and did not qualify for the final. Glania was a member of the 4 x 100 medley relay team which finished in 7th place.

References

External links 
 
 
 

German male swimmers
Living people
Olympic swimmers of Germany
Swimmers at the 2012 Summer Olympics
Swimmers at the 2016 Summer Olympics
Male backstroke swimmers
1988 births
World Aquatics Championships medalists in swimming
People from Fulda
Sportspeople from Kassel (region)
European Aquatics Championships medalists in swimming
20th-century German people
21st-century German people